The 1983 Currie Cup was the 45th edition of the Currie Cup, the premier annual domestic rugby union competition in South Africa.

See also

 Currie Cup

References

1983
1983 in South African rugby union
1983 rugby union tournaments for clubs